Aristomenios Haralampopoulos (born 20 May 1993) is an Australian professional footballer who plays as a defender for Cumberland United.

Career
Haralampopoulos grew up in Adelaide, South Australia, where he attended Scotch College, Adelaide and University Senior College. As a teenager, he was in the youth academy of Bolton Wanderers and was offered a scholarship by Preston North End. He left Adelaide for Greece for a trial at Iraklis FC. In 2016 he signed for Greek Football League club Acharnaikos before switching to Apollon Larissa in 2018. As of October 2018, he had returned to Acharnaikos where he was named club captain. He returned to Australia in January 2020 and joined Cumberland United in the South Australian National Premier League.

References

External links

1993 births
Living people
Australian soccer players
Australian people of Greek descent
Greek footballers
Association football defenders
National Premier Leagues players
Football League (Greece) players
West Adelaide SC players
Acharnaikos F.C. players
Soccer players from Adelaide